Sriram Adittya is an Indian film director and screenwriter who works primarily in Telugu films. He made his directorial debut in 2015 with Bhale Manchi Roju (2015).

Filmography

References

External links 

 

Indian male screenwriters
Indian film directors
Living people
Year of birth missing (living people)
Telugu screenwriters
Telugu film directors
21st-century Indian film directors